The 1952 United States Senate election in Michigan was held on November 4, 1952 alongside a special election to the same seat. 

Republican Senator Arthur Vandenberg died in office in April 1951. Governor G. Mennen Williams appointed journalist Blair Moody to fill Vandenberg's seat until a successor could be duly elected. Moody then lost the special election to complete Vandenberg's term and the regularly scheduled 1952 election to U.S. Representative Charles E. Potter, both held on November 4.

Republican primary

Candidates
 Eugene C. Keyes, Lieutenant Governor of Michigan
 John B. Martin Jr., Michigan Auditor General
 Charles E. Potter, U.S. Representative from Cheboygan
 Clifford Prevost

Keyes and Prevost were not candidates for the special election to finish Vandenberg's term.

Results

Regular

Special

Democratic primary

Candidates
 Blair Moody, interim appointee Senator
Louis C. Schwinger

Schwinger did not run in the special election.

Results

Regular

Special

General election

Results

Regular

Special

See also 
 1952 United States Senate elections

References 

1952
Michigan
United States Senate
Michigan 1952
Michigan 1952
United States Senate 1952